Samuel Watson (born 24 September 2001) is a British cyclist, who currently rides for UCI WorldTeam .

Major results

Road

2018
 1st Stage 4 Junior Tour of Wales
 3rd Road race, National Junior Championships
 8th Paris–Roubaix Juniors
2019
 1st Guido Reybrouck Classic
 1st Rutland–Melton International CiCLE Classic Juniors
 1st Stage 3 Junior Tour of Wales
 2nd Overall Trophée Centre Morbihan
1st  Points classification
 3rd Overall Keizer der Juniores
 3rd Gent–Wevelgem Junioren
 6th Overall Saarland Trofeo
2021
 1st Stage 3 Kreiz Breizh Elites
 5th Time trial, National Under-23 Championships
 7th Overall L'Etoile d'Or
 7th Gran Premio della Liberazione
2022
 1st  Road race, National Under-23 Championships
 1st Kattekoers
 1st Ilkley, National Circuit Series
 Grand Prix Jeseníky
1st  Points classification
1st Stage 3
 1st Stage 5 Tour Alsace
 National Championships
2nd Road race
2nd Circuit race
 5th Tro-Bro Léon
2023
 6th Grand Prix de Denain

Track

2018
 3rd Madison (with Oliver Rees), National Junior Championships
2019
 1st  Team pursuit, UEC European Junior Championships
 3rd Madison (with Max Rushby), National Junior Championships
2020
 2nd Team pursuit, National Championships
2022
 2nd  Madison (with William Tidball), UEC European Under-23 Championships

References

External links

2001 births
Living people
English male cyclists
British male cyclists
sportspeople from Leeds